Sándor Arnóth (22 February 196016 March 2011) was a Hungarian politician and member of the National Assembly of Hungary between 1998 and 2006, in 2008 and from 2010 until his death. He was also (since 2006) the mayor of his home town of Püspökladány, being re-elected in 2010. He was a member of Fidesz – Hungarian Civic Union.

Arnóth died in a car accident on 16 March 2011 near the city of Bag.

References

External links
 Arnóth Sándor az mkogy.hu-n
 Arnóth Sándor honlapja

1960 births
2011 deaths
20th-century Hungarian historians
Mayors of places in Hungary
Members of the National Assembly of Hungary (1998–2002)
Members of the National Assembly of Hungary (2002–2006)
Members of the National Assembly of Hungary (2006–2010)
Members of the National Assembly of Hungary (2010–2014)
Fidesz politicians
Road incident deaths in Hungary
People from Püspökladány